Ava Lavinia Gardner (December 24, 1922 – January 25, 1990) was an American actress. She first signed a contract with Metro-Goldwyn-Mayer in 1941 and appeared mainly in small roles until she drew critics' attention in 1946 with her performance in Robert Siodmak's film noir The Killers. She was nominated for an Academy Award for Best Actress for her performance in John Ford's Mogambo (1953), and for best actress for both a Golden Globe Award and BAFTA Award for her performance in John Huston's The Night of the Iguana (1964). She was a part of the Golden Age of Hollywood.

During the 1950s, Gardner established herself as a leading lady and one of the era's top stars with films like Show Boat, Pandora and the Flying Dutchman (both 1951), The Snows of Kilimanjaro (1952), The Barefoot Contessa (1954), Bhowani Junction (1956) and On the Beach (1959). She continued her film career for three more decades, appearing in the films 55 Days at Peking (1963), Seven Days in May (1964), The Bible: In the Beginning... (1966), Mayerling (1968), The Life and Times of Judge Roy Bean (1972), Earthquake (1974) and The Cassandra Crossing (1976). And in 1985, she had the major recurring role of Ruth Galveston on the primetime soap opera Knots Landing. She continued to act regularly until 1986, four years before her death in 1990, at the age of 67.

In 1999, the American Film Institute ranked Gardner  25 on its greatest female screen legends of classic American cinema list.

Early life 
Ava Lavinia Gardner was born on December 24, 1922, in Grabtown, North Carolina, the youngest of seven children. She had two older brothers, Raymond and Melvin, and four older sisters, Beatrice, Elsie Mae, Inez and Myra. Her parents, Mary Elizabeth "Molly" (née Baker; 1883–1943) and Jonas Bailey Gardner (1878–1938), were poor tobacco sharecroppers. She was of English and Scots-Irish ancestry.

She was raised in the Baptist faith of her mother. While the children were still young, the Gardners lost their property, and Molly received an offer to work as a cook and housekeeper at a dormitory for teachers at the nearby Brogden School that included board for the family and where Jonas continued sharecropping tobacco and supplemented the dwindling work with odd jobs at sawmills. In 1931, the teachers’ school closed, forcing the family to finally give up on their property dreams and move to a larger city, Newport News, Virginia, where Molly found work managing a boarding house for the city's many shipworkers. While in Newport News, Jonas became ill and died from bronchitis in 1938, when Ava was 15 years old. After her father's death, the family moved to Rock Ridge near Wilson, North Carolina, where Molly ran another boarding house for teachers. Ava attended high school in Rock Ridge and she graduated from there in 1939. She then attended secretarial classes at Atlantic Christian College in Wilson for about a year.

Career 
Gardner was visiting her sister Beatrice in New York City in the summer of 1940, when Beatrice's husband Larry Tarr, a professional photographer, offered to take her portrait as a gift for her mother Molly. He was so pleased with the results that he displayed the finished product in the front window of his Tarr Photography Studio on Fifth Avenue.

A Loews Theatres legal clerk, Barnard Duhan, spotted Gardner's portrait in Tarr's studio. At the time, Duhan often posed as a Metro-Goldwyn-Mayer (MGM) talent scout to meet girls, using the fact that MGM was a subsidiary of Loews. Duhan entered Tarr's studio and tried to get Gardner's number, but was rebuffed by the receptionist. Duhan made the comment, "Somebody should send her info to MGM", and the Tarrs did so immediately. Shortly after, Gardner, who at the time was a student at Atlantic Christian College, traveled to New York to be interviewed at MGM's New York office by Al Altman, head of MGM's New York talent department. With cameras rolling, he directed the 18-year-old to walk towards the camera, turn and walk away, then rearrange some flowers in a vase. He did not attempt to record her voice because her strong Southern accent made understanding her difficult for him. Louis B. Mayer, head of MGM, however, sent a telegram to Altman: "She can't sing, she can't act, she can't talk, she's terrific!" She was offered a standard contract by the studio and left school for Hollywood in 1941, with her sister Beatrice accompanying her. MGM's first order of business was to provide her with a speech coach, as her Carolina drawl was nearly incomprehensible to them, and Harriet Lee as her singing teacher.

Her first appearance in a feature film was as a walk-on in the Norma Shearer vehicle We Were Dancing (1942). Fifteen bit parts later she received her first screen billing in Ghosts on the Loose (1943) and is featured by name on the theatrical poster. After five years of bit parts, mostly at MGM and many of them uncredited, Gardner came to prominence in the Mark Hellinger production The Killers (1946), playing the femme fatale Kitty Collins.

Films from the next decade or so include The Hucksters (1947), Show Boat (1951), The Snows of Kilimanjaro (1952), Lone Star (1952), Mogambo (1953), The Barefoot Contessa (1954), Bhowani Junction (1956), The Sun Also Rises (1957) and On the Beach (1959). Off-camera, she could be witty and pithy, as in her assessment of director John Ford, who directed Mogambo ("The meanest man on earth. Thoroughly evil. Adored him!"). In The Barefoot Contessa, she played the role of doomed beauty Maria Vargas, a fiercely independent woman who goes from Spanish dancer to international movie star with the help of a Hollywood director played by Humphrey Bogart, with tragic consequences. Gardner's decision to accept the role was influenced by her own lifelong habit of going barefoot. Gardner played the role of Guinevere in Knights of the Round Table (1953), opposite actor Robert Taylor as Sir Lancelot. Indicative of her sophistication, she portrayed a duchess, a baroness and other women of noble lineage in her films of the 1950s.

Gardner played the role of Soledad in The Angel Wore Red (1960) with Dirk Bogarde as the male lead. She was billed between Charlton Heston and David Niven for 55 Days at Peking (1963), which was set in China during the Boxer Rebellion in 1900. The following year, she played her last major leading role in the critically acclaimed The Night of the Iguana (1964), based upon a Tennessee Williams play, and starring Richard Burton as an atheist clergyman and Deborah Kerr as a gentle artist traveling with her aged poet grandfather. John Huston directed the movie in Puerto Vallarta, Mexico, insisting on making the film in black and white – a decision he later regretted because of the vivid colors of the flora. Gardner received billing below Burton, but above Kerr. She was nominated for a Golden Globe Award for Best Actress in a Motion Picture – Drama and BAFTA Award for Best Actress in a Leading Role for her performance.

She next appeared again with Burt Lancaster, her co-star from The Killers, this time along with Kirk Douglas and Fredric March, in Seven Days in May (1964), a thriller about an attempted military takeover of the US government. Gardner played a former love interest of Lancaster's who could have been instrumental in Douglas's preventing a coup against the President of the United States.

John Huston chose Gardner for the part of Sarah, the wife of Abraham (played by George C. Scott), in the Dino De Laurentiis film The Bible: In the Beginning..., which was released in 1966. In a 1964 interview, she talked about why she accepted the role:

Two years later, in 1966, Gardner briefly sought the role of Mrs. Robinson in Mike Nichols' The Graduate (1967). She reportedly called Nichols and said, "I want to see you! I want to talk about this Graduate thing!" Nichols never seriously considered her for the part, preferring to cast a younger woman (Anne Bancroft was 35, while Gardner was 44), but he did visit her hotel, where he later recounted, "she sat at a little French desk with a telephone, she went through every movie star cliché. She said, 'All right, let's talk about your movie. First of all, I strip for nobody.'"

Gardner moved to London in 1968, undergoing an elective hysterectomy to allay her worries of contracting the uterine cancer that had claimed the life of her mother. That year, she appeared in Mayerling, in which she played the supporting role of Austrian Empress Elisabeth of Austria, opposite James Mason as Emperor Franz Joseph I.

She appeared in disaster films throughout the 1970s, notably Earthquake (1974) with Heston, The Cassandra Crossing (1976) with Lancaster, and the Canadian movie City on Fire (1979). She appeared briefly as Lillie Langtry at the end of The Life and Times of Judge Roy Bean (1972), and in The Blue Bird (1976). Her last movie was Regina Roma (1982). In the 1980s, she acted primarily on television, including the miniseries remake of The Long, Hot Summer and in a story arc on Knots Landing (both 1985).

Personal life

Marriages 
Soon after Gardner arrived in Los Angeles, she met fellow MGM contract player Mickey Rooney; they married on January 10, 1942. The ceremony was held in the remote town of Ballard, California, because MGM studio head Louis B. Mayer was worried that fans would desert Rooney's Andy Hardy movie series if it became known that their star was married. Gardner divorced Rooney in 1943, citing mental cruelty; privately blaming his gambling and womanizing, she didn't ruin his on-screen image as the clean-cut, judge's son Andy Hardy that the public adored.

Gardner's second marriage was equally brief, to jazz musician and bandleader Artie Shaw, from 1945 to 1946. Shaw had previously been married to Lana Turner. Gardner's third and last marriage was to singer and actor Frank Sinatra, from 1951 to 1957. She later said in her autobiography that he was the love of her life. Sinatra left his wife Nancy for Gardner, and their subsequent marriage made headlines.

Sinatra was blasted by gossip columnists Hedda Hopper and Louella Parsons, the Hollywood establishment, the Roman Catholic Church, and by his fans for leaving his wife for a femme fatale. Gardner used her considerable influence, particularly with Harry Cohn, to get Sinatra cast in his Oscar-winning role in From Here to Eternity (1953). That role and the award revitalized both Sinatra's acting and singing careers.

The Gardner-Sinatra marriage was tumultuous. Gardner confided to Artie Shaw, her second husband, that, "With him [Frank], it's impossible... It's like being with a woman. He's so gentle. It's as though he thinks I'll break, as though I'm a piece of Dresden china, and he's gonna hurt me." During their marriage, Gardner became pregnant twice, but aborted both babies. "MGM had all sorts of penalty clauses about their stars having babies", according to her autobiography, which was published eight months after her death. Following their divorce in 1957, Gardner and Sinatra remained good friends for the rest of her life. Of the support Sinatra gave Gardner, Ian McKellen commented that "If you have been married to Frank Sinatra, you don't need an agent".

Relationships 

Gardner became a friend of businessman and aviator Howard Hughes in the early to mid-1940s, and the relationship lasted into the 1950s. Gardner stated in her autobiography, Ava: My Story, that she was never in love with Hughes, but he was in and out of her life for about 20 years. Hughes' trust in Gardner was what kept their relationship alive. She described him as "painfully shy, completely enigmatic, and more eccentric ... than anyone [she] had ever met".

In 1957, Gardner traveled to Spain and began a friendship with writer Ernest Hemingway. She had starred in an adaptation of his The Sun Also Rises that year. Five years earlier, Hemingway had successfully urged producer Darryl F. Zanuck to cast Gardner in The Snows of Kilimanjaro, a film which adapted several of his short stories. While staying with Hemingway at his villa in San Francisco de Paula in Havana, Cuba, Gardner once swam alone without a swimsuit in his pool. After watching her, Hemingway ordered his staff: "The water is not to be emptied". Her friendship with Hemingway led to her becoming a fan of bullfighting and bullfighters, such as Luis Miguel Dominguín, who became her lover. "It was a sort of madness, honey", she later said of the time.

Gardner was also involved in a relationship with her live-in boyfriend and companion, American actor Benjamin Tatar, who worked in Spain as a foreign-language dubbing director. Tatar later wrote an autobiography in which he discussed his relationship with Gardner, though the book was never published.

Religion and political views 

Although Gardner was exposed to Christianity throughout her early years, she was an atheist later in life. Religion never played a positive role in her life, according to biographers and Gardner, in her autobiography Ava: My Story. Her friend Zoe Sallis, who met her on the set of The Bible: In the Beginning... when Gardner was living with John Huston in Puerto Vallarta, said Gardner always seemed unconcerned about religion. When Sallis asked her about religion once, Gardner replied, "It doesn't exist". Another factor that contributed to this was the death of Gardner's father in her youth, "Nobody wanted to know Daddy when he was dying. He was so alone. He was scared. I could see the fear in his eyes when he was smiling. I went to see the preacher, the guy who'd baptized me. I begged him to come and visit Daddy, just to talk to him, you know? Give him a blessing or something. But he never did. He never came. God, I hated him. Cold-arse bastards like that ought to ... I don't know ... they should be in some other racket, I know that. I had no time for religion after that. I never prayed. I never said another prayer". Concerning politics, Gardner was a lifelong Democrat, and supported Adlai Stevenson II in the 1952 United States presidential election.

Gardner was a staunch supporter of civil rights for African-Americans throughout her life. As a child growing up in North Carolina, she would often sit with African-American children in segregated parts of movie theaters. Her personal assistant, Rene Jordan, was African-American, and Gardner would often take her to clubs that were for whites only. She supported Henry A. Wallace of the Progressive Party, whose campaign in 1948 for the presidential election sought racial equality and desegregation.

She became a member of the NAACP in August 1968.

Death 

A bout of pneumonia, after a lifetime of smoking, coupled with her underlying condition of lupus erythematosus brought on a stroke in 1986 that left Gardner partially paralyzed. Although she could afford her medical expenses, Sinatra wanted to pay for her visit to a specialist in the United States, and she allowed him to make the arrangements for a medically staffed private plane. She died in January 1990, at the age of 67, of pneumonia and fibrosing alveolitis at her London home 34 Ennismore Gardens, where she had lived since 1968.

Gardner is buried in Sunset Memorial Park in Smithfield, North Carolina, next to her siblings and their parents, Jonas and Molly Gardner. The Ava Gardner Museum, incorporated in 1996, is located nearby.

Book 

In the last years of her life, Gardner asked Peter Evans to ghostwrite her autobiography, stating: "I either write the book or sell the jewels." Despite meeting with Evans frequently, and approving of most of his copy, Gardner eventually learned that Evans, along with the BBC, had once been sued by her ex-husband Frank Sinatra. Gardner and Evans's friendship subsequently cooled, and Evans left the project. Evans' notes and sections of his draft of Gardner's autobiography, which he based on their taped conversations, were published in the book Ava Gardner: The Secret Conversations after Evans' death in 2012.

Accolades 
Gardner was nominated for an Academy Award for Mogambo (1953); the award was won by Audrey Hepburn for Roman Holiday. Her performance as Maxine Faulk in The Night of the Iguana (1964) was well-reviewed, and she was nominated for a BAFTA Award and a Golden Globe. Additionally, Ava Gardner won the Silver Shell for Best Actress at the San Sebastián International Film Festival in 1964 for her performance in The Night of the Iguana.

Film portrayals 
Gardner has been portrayed by Marcia Gay Harden in the 1992 HBO miniseries, Sinatra, by Deborah Kara Unger in the 1998 television movie The Rat Pack, by Kate Beckinsale in the 2004 Howard Hughes biopic The Aviator, Anna Drijver in the 2012 Italian TV film Walter Chiari – Fino all'ultima risata, and Emily Elicia Low in Frank & Ava (2018).

The images of Gardner and Clark Gable are featured on the cover of Robin Gibb's 1983 album How Old Are You?

The 2018 Spanish television series Arde Madrid is a comedy-drama with thriller elements based on elements of Ava Gardner's life in Francoist Spain. Gardner is portrayed by Debi Mazar.

Filmography

Film

Television

References

Further reading 
 Cannon, Doris Rollins. Grabtown Girl: Ava Gardner's North Carolina Childhood and Her Enduring Ties to Home. Down Home Press, 2001; 
 Fowler, Karin. Ava Gardner: A Bio-Bibliography. Greenwood Press, 1990; 
 Gardner, Ava. Ava: My Story. Bantam, 1990; 
 Gigliotti, Gilbert, editor. Ava Gardner: Touches of Venus. Entasis Press, 2010; 
 Grobel, Lawrence. "Conversations with Ava Gardner", CreateSpace; accessed August 31, 2014.
 Rivers, Alton. Love, Ava: A Novel. St. Martin's Press, 2007; 
 Server, Lee. Ava Gardner: Love is Nothing. St. Martin's Press, 2006; 
 Mims, Bryan. "Our Ava", Our State Magazine, 2014
 Wayne, Jane Ellen. Ava's Men: The Private Life of Ava Gardner. Robson Books, 2004;

External links 

 
 Ava Gardner Biography, Britannica.com; accessed August 31, 2014.
 
 
 
 Ava Gardner – the journey to Hollywood at aenigma
 Ava Gardner profile, TVGuide.com; accessed August 31, 2014.
 Ava Gardner Museum, avagardner.org; accessed September 13, 2014.

1922 births
1990 deaths
20th-century American actresses
20th-century American singers
Activists for African-American civil rights
American anti-racism activists
American people of English descent
American people of Scotch-Irish descent
Actresses from North Carolina
American expatriates in England
American expatriate actresses in the United Kingdom
Female models from North Carolina
American film actresses
20th-century American memoirists
American television actresses
Burials in North Carolina
Deaths from pneumonia in England
Metro-Goldwyn-Mayer contract players
People from Johnston County, North Carolina
California Democrats
North Carolina Democrats
American atheists
20th-century American women singers